The Cyberdemon is a fictional character in the Doom video game franchise by id Software, where it was introduced in the first-person shooter game Doom in 1993. It has appeared in several other id games, including all main-line Doom sequels, Doom RPG, and Wolfenstein RPG as the Harbinger of Doom, along with other related media. The Cyberdemon became one of the most iconic characters of the Doom series along with its protagonist, the "Doomguy", and is often described as one of the most memorable bosses in video gaming history.

Appearances
The Cyberdemon is not mentioned in the manual for the original PC version, possibly so as to make its appearance a surprise for the player. The manual for the console versions describes it as a "half unfeeling machine, half raging horned devil. This walking nightmare has a rocket launcher for an arm and will definitely reach out and touch you." In the first Doom, the Cyberdemon is the toughest character, with 4,000 hit points (an equivalent of 40 direct rocket hits), receiving no splash damage from explosions. The Cyberdemons return in Doom II: Hell on Earth, where one is depicted on the cover art and the title screen.  

A redesigned Cyberdemon is the final boss in the reboot game Doom 3, where it is described as "Hell's mightiest warrior" and can be killed only with the Soul Cube. Another incarnation of the Cyberdemon appears as a boss in the 2016 reboot of Doom, this time depicted as an ancient demon lord reanimated and upgraded with advanced technology by the UAC, though retaining the original's susceptibility to the player's arsenal. 
It serves as the final boss of the 2016 reboot's virtual pinball adaptation (instead of Olivia Pierce, that game's main antagonist), whom the player can fight after fulfilling certain conditions, or by triggering wizard mode by completing five main missions. Also, at the start of each ball, the player is challenged to launch the ball past the Cyberdemon's arm cannon attacks to pull off a skill shot. 

In Doom Eternal an iteration of the Cyberdemon appears as a mini-boss under the name Tyrant. As with many of the returning demons in Doom Eternal, the Tyrant has been redesigned from its Doom (2016) incarnation to more closely resemble its design from the original Doom games.

In the action role-playing game Doom RPG, the Cyberdemon is created by an occultist scientist Kronos. The cyberdemon's first chronological appearance (in-universe) is in Wolfenstein RPG, where it appears fully organic as the Harbinger of Doom, summoned by the Nazis at Castle Wolfenstein during World War II. American commando William "B.J." Blazkowicz defeats it using the Spear of Destiny, destroying its right leg and left arm, and the Harbinger vows that it would have a rematch with Blazkowicz's descendant in the future, which happens when Stan Blazkowicz faces it in Doom II RPG.

An entire plot of the Doom comic is based on the Doomguy's frantic search for the BFG 9000 that he can use to destroy the Cyberdemon. In the Doom novels, the Cyberdemons' mechanical parts are steam powered and the characters call them "Steam Demons". A miniature figure of the Cyberdemon was included with the 1996 video game collection id Anthology and another appears in the 2011's Doom: The Boardgame.

Outside the Doom universe, the character was made available as a costume in Fall Guys: Ultimate Knockout with other Doom series costumes on January 12, 2021, for a limited time.

Reception
Computer Gaming World chose the Cyberdemon as the fourth-most-memorable computer game villain in their 1995 list: "Action gamers who thought they'd seen 'boss monsters' before suddenly realized they hadn't when they encountered the CyberDemon." In 2008, GamePro listed the Cyberdemon as the 16th-most-diabolical video game villain of all time. This "classic (and terrifying) boss" was selected by GameSpot as one of the 64 contesters in their 2010 poll "All Time Greatest Game Villain". IGN put this "one mean son of a bitch" at 69th place on their 2011 list of top villains in gaming. 

In 2008, IGN featured the Cyberdemon among their seven favourite monsters of gaming, adding that "in many ways, the granddaddy of the modern gaming monster, the Cyberdemon, is as fearsome today as he was 15 years ago." In 2010, Play magazine included Cyberdemon on the list of top ten scariest game monsters. On the list of the "coolest" video game villains by Complex in 2012, the Cyberdemon placed as 13th; Complex ranked the original encounter with Cyberdemon as the 12th-best boss battle of all time in 2013.

In 2006, The Boston Phoenix ranked the Cyberdemon as the 13th-greatest boss in video game history, adding that "in the annals of lazy game journalism, little stacks up to GamePro magazine's 'pro tip' for conquering Doom'''s baddest foe: 'To defeat the Cyberdemon, shoot at it until it dies.'" The widespread claim, occurring in many places on the Internet, that this 'pro tip' was published by GamePro, however, is erroneous, as it was actually created as a gag by Andrew "Linguica" Stine, co-founder of Doomworld. In 2008, IGN ranked the fight against the Cyberdemon as 46th-top video game moment, calling it "every bad boss you've ever fought rolled into one." It was also ranked as the 48th-top gaming moment by NowGamer in 2011. In 2018, Gabe Gurwin of Digital Trends ranked Cyberdemon as top 9 of 10 characters we want to see in Super Smash Bros.''

References

Further reading

External links
Cyberdemon at Giant Bomb

Amputee characters in video games
Bethesda characters
Cyborg characters in video games
Demon characters in video games
Doom (franchise)
Fictional mass murderers
Extraterrestrial characters in video games
First-person shooter characters
Fictional demons and devils
Horror video game characters
Microsoft antagonists
Science fantasy video game characters
Video game bosses
Video game characters introduced in 1993
Video game memes